Dana McLemore (born July 1, 1960) is a former professional American football cornerback in the National Football League for the San Francisco 49ers and the New Orleans Saints.  He played his high school football at Venice High School and college football at the University of Hawaii.

Restaurant 
In the 90's Dana owned a Hamburger restaurant in San Mateo CA, called Daddy Mac's.

1960 births
Living people
Players of American football from Los Angeles
American football cornerbacks
Hawaii Rainbow Warriors football players
San Francisco 49ers players
New Orleans Saints players
National Football League replacement players
Venice High School (Los Angeles) alumni